Affinity Partners is a global investment firm, based in Miami, formed in summer 2021 by Jared Kushner, a senior advisor to Donald Trump during his US presidency.

Kushner's firm received commitments of more than $3 billion by the end of 2021 to invest in American and Israeli companies that are expanding in India, Africa, the Middle East and other parts of Asia.  Investors include $2 billion from the Saudi public investment fund, with Kushner stating that he hopes to open an "investment corridor between Saudi Arabia and Israel", seen internationally as a "sign of warming ties between two historic rivals".

The firm has a staff of approximately 20 people, including private equity veterans Bret Pearlman and Asad Naqvi.

Capitalization and investors 
Kushner sought funds for the new company through the sovereign wealth funds of Gulf countries. The Saudi government's Public Investment Fund invested $2 billion in Kushner's firm, six months after Kushner left the White House.

The firm primarily depended on Saudi money.  In April 2022 it had $2.5 billion under its management.

In an interview with the Wall Street Journal, Kushner said: "If we can get Israelis and Muslims in the region to do business together, it will focus people on shared interests and shared values." He added, "we kicked off historic regional change which needs to be reinforced and nurtured to achieve its potential."

Investment portfolio 
The fund has invested in two undisclosed Israeli hi-tech companies.  The Wall Street Journal reported that "it is the first known instance that the Saudi Public Investment Fund’s cash will be directed to Israel, a sign of the kingdom’s increasing willingness to do business with the country."

In March 2022 Affinity executives heard pitches from 13 to 15 Israeli startups.

Controversy 
According to ethics experts, the investment created the appearance of potential payback for Kushner, given that he had been a staunch defender of Saudi crown prince Mohammed bin Salman while at the White House. The House Oversight Committee said on June 2, 2022, that it had opened an investigation into whether Kushner had traded on his government position to get the deal.

References 

Private equity
Private equity firms of the United States
Presidency of Donald Trump
Saudi Arabia–United States relations
Israel–Saudi Arabia relations